Robert Lacey Everett (28 January 1833 – 21 October 1916) was an English farmer and Liberal politician who sat in the House of Commons three times between 1885 and 1910.

Life
Everett was born at Rushmere St Andrew, Suffolk, the son of Joseph David Everett and his wife Elizabeth Garwood.

In 1880 Everett stood unsuccessfully for Parliament at East Suffolk as a farmers' candidate. He was elected as Member of Parliament (MP) for Woodbridge at the 1885 general election but lost the seat in 1886. He was elected again in 1892, but lost in 1895. He won the seat for the third time in 1906 but did not seek re-election in January 1910.

Everett died at the age of 83.

Everett married in 1863, Elizabeth Nussey, daughter of Obadiah Nussey of Leeds, a cloth merchant, and manufacturer.

Publications
 Why the Malt Tax should be repealed,  [1865?].
 Tithes: their history, use and future,  1887.
 Y Degwm: ei hanes, ei ddefnyddiad a'i ddyfodol [translation into Welsh of Tithes ...], 1887.
 Agricultural distress: a cause and a remedy,  1893.
 The real cause of agricultural distress,  1895.

References

Sources

External links 
 

1833 births
1916 deaths
Liberal Party (UK) MPs for English constituencies
UK MPs 1885–1886
UK MPs 1892–1895
UK MPs 1906–1910
People from Suffolk Coastal (district)